Yang Mao-liang (also spelled Yang Mouliang) is a high-ranking member of the Myanmar National Democratic Alliance Army (MNDAA). He was ousted by Peng Jiasheng from MNDAA and Kokang. Yang Mao-Liang established the Peace Myanmar Group company a water and alcoholic beverage manufacture (Myanmar Rum and Myanmar Whisky) at year of 1993.

Yang's brother, Yang Mao-xian, was executed in 1994 by China for his involvement in trafficking heroin into southern China.

See also
 Bai Xuoqian

References

Politics of Myanmar
Burmese rebels
Year of birth missing (living people)
Living people
Burmese people of Chinese descent